Theodor Wegelius  (7 March 1850, Helsinki - 16 June 1932) was a Finnish politician. He was a member of the Senate of Finland.

References

1850 births
1932 deaths
Politicians from Helsinki
People from Uusimaa Province (Grand Duchy of Finland)
Swedish-speaking Finns
Swedish People's Party of Finland politicians
Finnish senators
Members of the Diet of Finland
Governors of the Bank of Finland